City Kickboxing is a mixed martial arts training gym based in Auckland, New Zealand. The gym features professional fighters who have competed in many major promotions, such as the Ultimate Fighting Championship (UFC), Bellator, ONE Championship, and Dibella Entertainment (Boxing).

History 
Eugene Bareman and Doug Viney founded City Kickboxing in 2007. The duo hoped that having their own premises would allow them to focus more on their training but quickly found the economics of running a gym was all-consuming and soon after transitioned to training professional fighters.

Notable students & alumnae

MMA 
 Israel Adesanya - Former UFC Middleweight Champion
 Alexander Volkanovski - Current UFC Featherweight Champion
 Kai Kara-France - #2 Ranked UFC Flyweight
 Dan Hooker - #13 Ranked UFC Lightweight
 Shane Young - UFC Featherweight Fighter
 Brad Riddell - #14 Ranked UFC Lightweight
 Carlos Ulberg - UFC Light Heavyweight Fighter
 Tyson Pedro - UFC Light Heavyweight Fighter
* Champions and rankings as of March 27, 2022.
)

Boxing 
 Junior Fa - former WBO Oriental interim & New Zealand national (NZPBA version) Heavyweight Champion
 Hemi Ahio - Current WBC Middle East, Former IBO Oceania, two time New Zealand national (NZNBF & PBCNZ version) Heavyweight Champion
 Baby Nansen - Former New Zealand national (PBCNZ version) & South Pacific (PBCNZ version) Super Lightweight Champion

Awards
After both Adesanya and Volkanovski claimed UFC championships in 2019, Bareman and City Kickboxing were named as the Coach of the Year and the Gym of the Year, respectively, by MMAJunkie.com.

MMAjunkie.com
2019 Gym of the Year
2019 Coach of the Year (Eugene Bareman)
CombatPress.com
2019 Gym of the Year
2019 Coach of the Year (Eugene Bareman)
2020 Gym of the Year
2020 Coach of the Year (Eugene Bareman)
2021 Gym of the Year
World MMA Awards
2022 Gym of the Year
2022 Coach of the Year (Eugene Bareman)

See also
List of Top Professional MMA Training Camps

References

External links
 

Kickboxing training facilities
Mixed martial arts training facilities
Organisations based in Auckland
Sport in Auckland